This list of castles in Provence-Alpes-Côte d'Azur is a list of medieval castles or châteaus forts in the region in southern France.

Links in italics are links to articles in the French Wikipedia.

Alpes-de-Haute-Provence

Alpes-Maritimes

Castles of which little remains include 
Château de Roquefort.

Bouches-du-Rhône

Hautes-Alpes

Var

Vaucluse

See also
 List of castles in France
 List of châteaux in France

References

 Provence-Alpes-Côte d'Azur